Lepidoblepharis emberawoundule is a species of gecko, a lizard in the family Sphaerodactylidae. The species is endemic to Panama.

Etymology
The specific name, emberawoundule, is a compound word in honor of three indigenous peoples of Panama: the Emberá, the Wounaan, and the Guna. The Guna call themselves Dule meaning "people".

Geographic range
L. emberawoundule is found in Comarga Guna Yala, an indigenous province in northeastern Panama.

References

Further reading
Batista A, Ponce M, Vesely M, Mebert K, Hertz A, Köhler G, Carrizo A, Lotzkat S (2015). "Revision of the genus Lepidoblepharis (Reptilia: Squamata: Sphaerodactylidae) in Central America, with the description of three new species". Zootaxa 3994 (2): 187–221. (Lepidoblepharis emberawoundule, new species, pp. 194-196 + Figures 3–7, 10).

Lepidoblepharis
Reptiles of Panama
Endemic fauna of Panama
Reptiles described in 2015
Taxa named by Gunther Köhler